Blai Mallarach Güell (born 21 August 1987, Olot, Spain) is a Spanish water polo player. At the 2012 Summer Olympics, he competed for the Spain men's national water polo team in the men's event. He is 6 ft 2 inches tall. He played for Spanish powerhouse CN Atlètic-Barceloneta.

Honours
CN Barcelona
LEN Euro Cup: 2003–04
Spanish Championship: 2003–04, 2004–05
Copa del Rey: 2002–03, 2010–11
Mladost
Croatian Cup: 2011–12
Olympiacos
LEN Champions League runners-up: 2015–16 
Greek Championship: 2012–13, 2013–14, 2014–15, 2015–16
Greek Cup: 2012–13, 2013–14, 2014–15, 2015–16
CN Atlètic-Barceloneta
Spanish Championship: 2016–17, 2017–18, 2018–19, 2019–20, 2020–21, 2021–22
Copa del Rey: 2016–17, 2017–18, 2018–19, 2019–20, 2020–21, 2021–22
Supercopa de España: 2018, 2019

See also
 List of World Aquatics Championships medalists in water polo

References

External links
 

Spanish male water polo players
1987 births
Living people
Olympiacos Water Polo Club players
Olympic water polo players of Spain
Water polo players at the 2012 Summer Olympics
World Aquatics Championships medalists in water polo
People from Olot
Sportspeople from the Province of Girona
Mediterranean Games silver medalists for Spain
Mediterranean Games medalists in water polo
Competitors at the 2013 Mediterranean Games
Water polo players from Catalonia
Water polo players at the 2020 Summer Olympics
21st-century Spanish people